A molera (also known as a fontanel) is a "soft spot" on the top of a Chihuahua's skull; it is the equivalent to the bregmatic or anterior fontanelle in human babies, but unlike most mammals Chihuahua's fontanelle persist into maturity. Historically it has been very common amongst Chihuahuas and was regarded as a mark of purity for this miniature dog breed. It is still mentioned in many Chihuahua breed standards, however, it is considered a fault in European countries because of concern that this might reflect underlying malformations such as hydrocephalus and ventriculomegaly, Chiari-like malformation and syringomyelia. Fontanelles are fibrous, membrane-covered gaps that lie between the skull bones and at the intersection of the cranial sutures. The cranial sutures are the junctions between cranial (or skull) bones. The fontanelles serve as the major sites of bone expansion during post-natal skull growth which accommodates the enlarging brain. The Chihuahua likely has a molera because of neuroparenchymal disproportion i.e. a proportionally big brain for the skull. This is likely because there is premature closure of the skull base cranial sutures (brachycephaly due to craniosynostosis). To accommodate the developing brain there is increased growth of the skull bone in a parallel plane giving the dog a characterised domed or "apple-headed" appearance. 

A Finnish study from (University of Helsinki with University of Surrey) found that increased number and size of persistent fontanelles in Chihuahuas were associated with small body size, syringomyelia (fluid filled cavities in the spinal cord), ventriculomegaly (i.e. enlargement of the lateral ventricles), and craniocervical junction abnormalities. The challenges the belief that a molera is  clinically irrelevant finding not associated with other structural abnormalities.
 
Explanation of often misquoted veterinary sources (Greene and Braund / Rivers and Walker)
There was no such study. This was an unreferenced statement, although it reflected clinical experience, and was made over 30 years ago in the 3rd edition of Ettinger's Veterinary Internal Medicine. This statement was not kept in subsequent editions and this tome is now being revised for the 9th edition. It is also incorrectly stated on multiple websites that there was "a separate study conducted by Dr. Walker and Dr. Rivers at the University of Minnesota that found no correlation between the presence or size of a molera and hydrocephalus". This is also incorrect. This study was entitled "Hydrocephalus in the Dog: Utility of Ultrasonography as an Alternate Diagnostic Imaging Technique"  published in Journal of the American Animal Hospital Association in 1992. The question that this study actually addressed was whether ventricles and associated cerebrospinal fluid pathways could be investigated by ultrasound through the persistent bregmatic fontanelle (molera). There were 26 dogs in the study of which 6 had clinical hydrocephalous (i.e. were neurologically abnormal). Of the 6 dogs with clinical hydrocephalus (2 x chihuahua, 1 x poodle x, 1 x Pomeranian, 1 x Boston terrier and 1 x Yorkshire terrier), ultrasound through the molera was helpful in confirming the diagnosis of hydrocephalus noninvasively and provided information about dilation of the lateral, 3rd and cranial cerebral aqueduct. Ultrasound through the molera was also useful in revealing ventriculomegaly in 5 of 20 (supposedly) clinically normal dogs and these included Chihuahua (9 months old, mentation depressed), Lhasa Apso (5 weeks old), 2x Shih Tzu (3 and 5 weeks old) and Affenpinscher (9 weeks old – and returned to breeder because dull).The remaining 15 dogs (14 shih tzu and 1  Lhasa Apso) had normal ventricle size according to this ultrasound study. 14/15 of the dogs in the study were 6 weeks old or less i.e. the study was predominantly in puppies not adult dogs. The older dog was a 5 year old Shih Tzu. In other words all the Chihuahua in this study were affected with hydrocephalus and molera; this study did not investigate presence or size of a molera and hydrocephalus.

References 
Kiviranta, A‐M, Rusbridge, C, Lappalainen, AK, Junnila, JJT, Jokinen, TS. Persistent fontanelles in Chihuahuas. Part II: Association with craniocervical junction abnormalities, syringomyelia, and ventricular volume. J Vet Intern Med. 2021; 1– 9. https://doi.org/10.1111/jvim.16123

Greene CE. Braund KG. Diseases of the brain. In: Ettinger Sl, ed. Textbook of veterinary internal medicine. 3rd cd. Philadelphia: WB Saunders, 1989:pp584

Rivers WJ, Walter PA Hydrocephalus in the Dog: Utility of Ultrasonography as an Alternate Diagnostic Imaging Technique, Journal of the American Animal Hospital Association, 1992, 28, 578-623

External links 
The Chihuahua Club of America. Molera Statement

Dog health